The Penang Undersea Tunnel is a tunnel under construction between Butterworth on the mainland and George Town on the island of Penang in northern Malaysia. Construction began in 2016. The 7.2 km tunnel will connect Butterworth, Seberang Perai in the east to George Town, Penang Island in the west. When completed in 2025, it will become the first undersea tunnel in Malaysia and the second in Southeast Asia after the Marina Coastal Expressway (MCE) in Singapore. The undersea tunnel is part of the Penang Roads and Tunnels project.

The project is undertaken by the State Government of Penang and the main contractor Consortium Zenith BUCG Sdn Bhd a member of Zenith Group. With a cost of RM6.3 billion, the tunnel will be the largest privately funded public works project in Penang. There will be a toll plaza and also a railway reserve for future Penang LRT at the undersea tunnel.

Controversies

Bribery 
In July 2018, Consortium Zenith Construction Sdn Bhd's (CZC) senior executive director Datuk Zarul Ahmad Mohd Zulkifli confirmed that CZC has indeed paid out the RM22 million to two individuals but did not want to elaborate further. In April 2019, businessman G Gnanaraja was charged with cheating Consortium Zenith Construction Sdn Bhd executive director Zarul Ahmad Mohd Zulkifli of RM19 million between July and August 2017 at various locations in Petaling Jaya and Kuala Lumpur relating to Penang undersea tunnel project, he was arrested by the MACC.

Leaked documents 
In February 2019, blogger Raja Petra Kamarudin started publishing series of articles on Penang undersea tunnel corruption scandal based on leaked MACC document which alleged the former chief minister Lim Guan Eng and various Pakatan Harapan and Barisan Nasional leaders in kickbacks amounting to hundreds of millions.

UMNO secretary-general Annuar Musa called for a probe into the alleged leak of Malaysian Anti-Corruption Commission (MACC) investigation papers by Raja Petra Kamarudin. Gerakan Vice President Oh Tong Keong urged Penang state executive councillors and former chief minister Lim Guan Eng should take controversial blogger Raja Petra Kamarudin to court for defamation over the latter's undersea tunnel graft allegations. MCA president Wee Ka Siong urged the Malaysian Anti-Corruption Commission (MACC) to confirm the authenticity of leaked documents allegedly linked to its investigations into the Penang undersea tunnel project. MACC confirmed that it was investigating the matter and that it had opened six investigation papers on the tunnel project. MACC lodged a police report in February 2019 over the leaked investigation papers. Deputy Minister in the Prime Minister's Department Mohamed Hanipa Maidin responding in the Dewan Rakyat confirmed that MACC had lodged the report on 28 February and the matter was being investigated.

List of interchanges

Tunnel side

Gurney Drive Paired Road side

References

External links
Penang Undersea Tunnel project on Zenith Group

Penang Integrated Transportation Masterplan
Northern Corridor Economic Region
Expressways in Malaysia
Expressways and highways in Penang
Buildings and structures under construction in Penang
Toll tunnels in Malaysia
Roads in Penang